BankUnited, Inc. (NYSE: BKU), with total assets of $37.0 billion at December 31, 2022 is the bank holding company of BankUnited, N.A., a national bank headquartered in Miami Lakes, Florida that provides a full range of banking and related services to individual and corporate customers through banking centers located in the state of Florida, New York metropolitan area and Dallas, Texas and a comprehensive suite of wholesale products to customers through an Atlanta office focused on the Southeast region. BankUnited also offers certain commercial lending and deposit products through national platforms.

BankUnited, Inc. was organized by a management team led by John A. Kanas and was initially capitalized with $945.0 million by a group of investors including W.L. Ross, Blackstone Group, The Carlyle Group and Centerbridge Partners. On May 21, 2009, BankUnited acquired substantially all of the assets and assumed all of the non-brokered deposits and substantially all other liabilities of BankUnited, FSB, from the FDIC in the FSB Acquisition. On February 2, 2011, the Company completed its IPO.

The bank offers a broad range of online services, treasury management tools for businesses and traditional depository and lending products.

External links

 Official Website

References

Companies listed on the New York Stock Exchange
Banks established in 1984
Banks based in Florida
Companies that filed for Chapter 11 bankruptcy in 2009
Re-established companies
Private equity portfolio companies
Companies based in Miami
The Carlyle Group